Joseph Rowbotham (8 July 1831 – 22 December 1899) was an English first-class cricketer, who played for Sheffield Cricket Club (aka Yorkshire) 1854–62; and for Yorkshire County Cricket Club 1863–76. In addition, he represented Marylebone Cricket Club (MCC) in 1856; the North 1857–75; the All-England Eleven (AEE) 1862–68; the Players 1864–69; an England XI in 1864; the combined Cambridgeshire and Yorkshire team in 1864; the combined Nottinghamshire and Yorkshire team in 1872; the United North of England Eleven (UNEE) 1870–75; and the Players of the North 1874–76).  He played in minor and odds matches in 1865 on tour with the AEE.

Rowbotham was born in Highfield, Sheffield; died in Morecambe. He was Yorkshire's captain in 1873 and 1875. In 141 first-class matches, he scored 3,694 runs at 15.92, with three centuries and a highest score of 113 against Surrey. An occasional wicketkeeper, he held seventy catches and completed five stumpings. He also took three wickets for 37 against Gloucestershire in his only first-class bowling spell.

He umpired in one Test match: England versus Australia at Manchester from 10 to 12 July 1884.

References

External links
 Cricinfo Profile
 Cricket Archive Statistics

1831 births
1899 deaths
All-England Eleven cricketers
English Test cricket umpires
English cricketers
Marylebone Cricket Club cricketers
Non-international England cricketers
North v South cricketers
Players cricketers
Players of the North cricketers
Sheffield Cricket Club cricketers
Cricketers from Sheffield
United North of England Eleven cricketers
Yorkshire cricket captains
Yorkshire cricketers
Cambridgeshire and Yorkshire cricketers
English cricketers of 1826 to 1863
English cricketers of 1864 to 1889